Pierre Le Bigaut (born 17 September 1959, in Guémené-sur-Scorff) is a former French professional road bicycle racer.

Major results

1982
Circuit de l'Indre
1983
Tour de France:
Winner stage 14
Joigny
Brest
1988
Tour du Finistère

External links 

Official Tour de France results for Pierre Le Bigault

1959 births
Living people
People from Guémené-sur-Scorff
French male cyclists
French Tour de France stage winners
Sportspeople from Morbihan
Cyclists from Brittany